
This is a list of aircraft in alphabetical order beginning with 'S'.

St

St Andrews Aviation
(Panama City, Florida, United States)
St Andrews Viking

St Croix
(St Croix Aircraft)
St Croix Excelsior
St Croix Pietenpol Aerial
St Croix Pietenpol Aircamper
St Croix Sopwith Triplane

St. George 
 St. George Falcon
 St. George KIT-1
 St. George KIT-2
 St. George 1912 helicopter

St. Louis
(St. Louis Aircraft Co, 8000 N Broadway, St. Louis MO.)
 St Louis C2-60 Cardinal
 St Louis C2-65
 St Louis C2-85 Cardinal
 St Louis C2-90 Senior Cardinal
 St Louis C2-100 Special
 St Louis C2-100 Super Cardinal
 St Louis C2-110 Super Cardinal
 St Louis PT-1W (Company designation)
 St Louis PT-35 (Company designation)
 St Louis PT-LM-4 (Company designation)
 St Louis CG-5
 St Louis CG-6
 St Louis PT-15

St-Just Aviation
(Boucherville, Quebec, Canada)
St-Just Cyclone
St-Just Super-Cyclone

Stabilaire 
(Stabilaire Inc (Albert J Downs), Wenham MA)
 Stabilaire A

Stadlman 
(Anthony Stadlman & J E Roth, Chicago IL.)
 Stadlman Exhibition Biplane

Stadtler (aircraft constructor) 
()
 Stadtler Triplane

Stafford 
(T G Stafford, Black Mountain NC.)
 Stafford A-2
 Stafford TG Sport

Stafford 
(Walter Stafford/Justacrate Airplane Co, Greenville SC.)
 Justacrate Black Buzzard

Stahlwerk-Mark
(Stahlwerk Mark Flugzeugbau)
 Stahlwerk-Mark R.III
 Stahlwerk-Mark R.IV
 Stahlwerk-Mark R.V
 Stahlwerk-Mark MD.I
 Stahlwerk-Mark ME.I
 Stahlwerk-Mark ME.II
 Stahlwerk-Mark MS.II
 Stahlwerk-Mark W.I

Staib 
(Wilbur Staib, Carthage MO.)
 Staib DM
 Staib Special
 Staib LB-1 Special
 Staib LB-2
 Staib Little Bastard
 Staib The Monster
 Staib LB-3
 Staib LB-4
 Staib Airy-Plane
 Staib LB-5
 Staib Little Bit
 Staib Helicopter

Stalker (aircraft constructor) 
 Stalker CB-301
 Stalker CB-310 Tomboy

Stallings 
(Jerry Stallings, Houston TX.)
 Stallings Air Master

Stampe et Renard 
 Stampe et Renard SR.6
 Stampe et Renard SR.7
 Stampe et Renard SR.8
 Stampe et Renard SR.9
 Stampe et Renard SR.10
 Stampe et Renard SR.11
 Stampe et Renard SR.12

Stampe et Vertongen 
(J. Stampe et M. Vertongen)
 Stampe et Vertongen RSV.18
 Stampe et Vertongen RSV.20/100
 Stampe et Vertongen RSV.22
 Stampe et Vertongen RSV.23/180
 Stampe et Vertongen RSV.26/100
 Stampe et Vertongen RSV.26/140
 Stampe et Vertongen RSV.28
 Stampe et Vertongen RSV.32
 Stampe et Vertongen SV.4
 Stampe et Vertongen SV.5 Tornado
 Stampe et Vertongen SV.6
 Stampe et Vertongen SV.7
 Stampe et Vertongen SV.8
 Stampe et Vertongen SV.9
 Stampe et Vertongen SV.10
 Stampe et Vertongen SV.18
 Stampe et Vertongen SV.26

Standard 
(Standard Aircraft Corp, Plainfield NJ.)
 Standard E-1 (M-Defense)
 Standard E-4
 Gates-Day GD-24
 Standard H-1
 Standard H-2
 Standard H-3
 Standard H-4-H
 Standard J-1
 Standard JR-1
 Standard SJ-1
 Standard SJ (not directly related to SJ-1)
 Standard Twin-Hydro
 Standard TH-D

Stapp 
(E Graydon Stapp, Alanread TX.)
 Stapp B-1

Star 
(Star Engineering Company)
 Star 1910 Monoplane

Star 
(Star Aircraft Div, Phillips Petroleum Co, Bartlesville OK)
 Star Cavalier A
 Star Cavalier B
 Star Cavalier C
 Star Cavalier D
 Star Cavalier E
 Star Cavalier F

Star 
(Star Aviation, New Braunfels TX.)
 Star Lone Star Sport Helicopter

Star Bee Gyros
(Star Bee Gyros LLC, Worcester, Massachusetts)
Star Bee Light
Star Bee Total Bee

Star Flight 
(Star Flight Manufacturing)
 Star Flight Starfire
 Star Flight Tristar
 Star Flight TX-1000
 Star Flight SC-1000
 Star Flight AC-2000

Star-Kraft 
(Star-Kraft, Ft Scott KS.)
 Star-Kraft 700

Star-Lite 
(Star-Lite Aircraft Inc, San Antonio, Texas, United States)
 Star-Lite SL-1
 Star-Lite Aircraft Star Lite

Star-Lite 
(Star-Lite Engineering Ltd, Englewood, Ohio, United States)
 Star-Lite Warp 1-A

Star-Nickel 
 Star-Nickel SN.01

Starck
(André Starck / Avions Starck)
 Starck Chanute-style glider
 Starck AS.07 Stabiplan
 Starck AS.10
 Starck AS.20
 Starck AS.27 Starcky
 Starck AS.37
 Starck AS.57
 Starck AS.70 Jac
 Starck AS.71
 Starck AS.72
 Starck AS.75
 Starck AS.80 Holiday (aka Lavadoux)
 Starck AS.90 New Look
 Starck Super New Look
 Starck-Nickel SN.01

Starfire 
(Starfire Aviation Inc, Tempe, Arizona, United States)
 Starfire Firebolt
 Starfire Firebolt Convertible

Stargate
(Stargate Inc., McMinnville, Oregon, United States)
Stargate YT-33

Starling 
(Starling Aircraft Co., 224 N 1st St, Minneapolis MN.)
 Starling H-11
 Starling H-12 Imperial

Starr 
(Robert H Starr, Phoenix AZ. )
 Starr Bumble Bee I
 Starr Bumble Bee II

Starwing 
(Starwing Co/American Aviation Corp, Massillon OH.)
 Starwing G-4

Stástik
(Jan Stástik / J. Stástik & Co.)
 Stástik Dreadnaught

Statler 
(William H Statler, Northridge CA.)
 Statler Dos Equis Challenger
 Statler Firefly

State Aircraft Factory (Greece)
see KEA

States 
(States Aircraft Co, 1633 Wentworth Ave, Chicago Heights IL.)
 States B-2
 States B-3 (a.k.a. S-E-5)
 States B-4

Stauffer 
(O L Stauffer, Elkhart IN.)
 Stauffer Gyroplane

STC
(Societata de Transport Constanța)
 STC R.A.S.-1 Getta – designer Radu Stoika

Stearman 
(Stearman Aircraft Div, United Aircraft Corp, Wichita.)
 Stearman 4
 Stearman 6
 Stearman X-70
 Stearman 73
 Stearman 75
 Stearman 76
 Stearman 80
 Stearman 81
 Stearman X-85
 Stearman X-90
 Stearman X-91
 Stearman C1
 Stearman C2
 Stearman C3
 Stearman CAB-1 Coach
 Stearman LT-1
 Stearman Cloudboy
 Stearman Kaydet
 Stearman Senior Speedmail
 Stearman Junior Speedmail
 Stearman Special
 Stearman Sporstster
 Stearman M-2 Speedmail
 Stearman BT-3
 Stearman BT-5
 Stearman PT-9
 Stearman XPT-943
 Stearman PT-13
 Stearman PT-17
 Stearman PT-18 (Boeing-Stearman)
 Stearman NS
 Stearman N2S
 Stearman OSS
 Stearman-Hammond JH-1
 Stearman-Hammond Y-1M (Y-125)
 Stearman-Hammond Y-1S (Y-150)

Stearman
(SStearman-Jensen Aircraft Co / Stearman Aviation Incorporated)
 Stearman B-2

Stearman-Varney 
( (Lloyd) Stearman-(Walter) Varney Inc, San Francisco Bay Airdrome, Alameda CA.)
 Stearman-Varney Sport

Stebbins-Geynet 
()
 Stebbins-Geynet Model A
 Stebbins-Geynet Model B

Steco 
((James S & Ralph C) Stephens Engineering Co, Chicago IL)
 Stephens Aerohydroplane

Stedman 
(Charles T Stedman et al., South Bend IN.)
 Stedman 1929 Biplane
 Stedman 1930 Biplane

Steglau
(Ivan Ivanovich Steglav)
 Steglav 1912 biplane
 Steglav No.2 biplane

Steen 
((Lamar) Steen Aero Lab Inc, Brighton CO.)
 Steen Skybolt
 Steen Super Skybolt
 Steen Steenship 1

Steere
(John Steere)
 Steere Bodacious

Steir
(Steir Aviators Union of Graz, Austria)
 Steir Austria (regn. A-21)

Steffan 
(Frank Steffan, Los Angeles CA.)
 Steffan Re-inforced Biplane

Stellar Aircraft
(Bloomfield, Indiana, United States)
Stellar Astra

Stelmaszyk
(Władysław Stelmasyk)
 Stelmaszyk S.1 Bozena

Stemme 
(Stemme GmbH)
 Stemme S2 – unpowered glider, 2 seater
 Stemme S6 – touring motorglider
 Stemme S7 – unpowered glider, 2 seater
 Stemme S8 – touring motorglider
 Stemme S10 – Self Launching motorglider and original aircraft
 Stemme S12
 Stemme S15 -Prototype UAV based on S6
 Stemme TG-11A
 Stemme ASP S15

Stepanich 
(Rudolph & Anna Stepanich, Rosedale NY.)
 Stepanich 1930 aeroplane
 Stepanich Center-Wing

Stephens 
(Clayton L Stephens, San Bernardino CA.)
 Stephens Akro
 Stephens Akro Laser Z-200

Stephens & Fisher 
(Roy Fisher & Glen Stephens, 2600 Onieda St, Denver CO.)
 Stephens & Fisher Scamp 36

Stepnic (aircraft constructor) 
 Stepnic 1929 Monoplane

Stern
(Rene Stern, France)
Stern ST 80 Balade
Stern ST-85
Stern ST 87 Vega

Steve Wright (aircraft constructor) 
 Steve Wright Stagger-Ez

Stevens 
(B Stevens & Sons, Woonsocket RI.)
 Stevens 1911 Monoplane
 Stevens 1915 Biplane

Stevenson 
(Gary L Stevenson, Spenard AK.)
 Stevenson Windstreak

Steward-Davis 
(Steward-Davis Inc (founders: Herb Steward, Stanley Davis), Compton Airport CA. )
 Steward-Davis Jet-Packet 1600
 Steward-Davis Jet-Packet 3200
 Steward-Davis Jet-Packet 3400
 Steward-Davis Jet-Packet II
 Steward-Davis Jet-Pak C-119
 Steward-Davis Skytruck I
 Steward-Davis Skypallet
 Steward-Davis Stolmaster
 Steward-Davis Super Catalina
 Steward-Davis "Val"

Stewart 
((Robert W) Stewart Aerial Vehicle Co)
 Stewart 1910 parafoil
 Stewart 1911 Biplane

W.F. Stewart Company 
(Flint, Michigan, United States)
 Stewart M-1
 Stewart M-2

Stewart 
(C M Stewart, Loyal OK.)
 Stewart Model 1

Stewart 
(Charles L Stewart, Tulsa OK.)
 Stewart B

Stewart 
(Walter E Stewart, Stewart Field, Tyler TX.)
 Stewart Texas Bluebird

Stewart 
(Stewart Aircraft Corp, Menominee MI.)
 Stewart Headwind
 Stewart Foo Fighter

Stewart
(Donald M. Stewart)
 Stewart 265

Stewart 
(Ed Stewart, Paso Robles CA.)
 Stewart Swifty#2

Stewart
(Jim D. Stewart)
 Stewart Colibri

Stewart 51
(Vero Beach, Florida, United States)
Stewart S-51D Mustang

Stierlin 
 Stierlin Helicopter

Stiles 
(Stiles Aircraft, Sycamore IL. 1928: 538 S Dearborn St, Chicago IL.)
 Stiles Dragon Fly

Stinson 
(Stinson Aircraft Corp, Northville MI)
 Stinson AT-19
 Stinson C-81 Reliant
 Stinson C-91
 Stinson CQ-2
 Stinson L-1 Vigilant
 Stinson L-5 Sentinel
 Stinson L-9
 Stinson L-12 Reliant
 Stinson L-13
 Stinson O-49 Vigilant
 Stinson O-54
 Stinson O-62 Sentinel
 Stinson OY
 Stinson R3Q
 Stinson RQ
 Stinson QR
 Stinson U-19 Sentinel
 Stinson SB-1 Detroiter
 Stinson SM-1 Detroiter
 Stinson SM-2
 Stinson SM-3
 Stinson SM-4 Junior
 Stinson SM-5
 Stinson SM-6 Detroiter
 Stinson SM-7 Junior
 Stinson SM-8 Junior
 Stinson SM-9
 Stinson SM-6000
 Stinson SR Reliant
 Stinson 10 Voyager
 Stinson 74
 Stinson 75
 Stinson 76 Sentinel
 Stinson 77
 Stinson 105 Voyager
 Stinson 108
 Stinson Amphibian
 Stinson Detroiter
 Stinson HW-75
 Stinson HW-80
 Stinson HW-90
 Stinson Junior
 Stinson Model A amphibian (twin parasol amphibian)
 Stinson Model A trimotor (low wing airliner)
 Stinson Model L
 Stinson Model M
 Stinson Model O
 Stinson Model R
 Stinson Model S Junior
 Stinson Model T
 Stinson Model U
 Stinson Model W
 Stinson Reliant
 Stinson Voyager
 Stinson-Faucett F-19
 Stinson Greyhound

Stipa 
 Stipa-Caproni

Stits 
(Ray Stits, Battle Creek MI)
 Stits SA-1A Junior
 Stits SA-2A Sky Baby
 Stits SA-3 Playboy
 Stits SA-4A Executive
 Stits-Besler Executive
 Stits SA-5 Flut-R-Bug
 Stits SA-6 Flut-R-Bug
 Stits SA-7 Sky-Coupe
 Stits SA-8A Skeeto
 Stits SA-9A Sky-Coupe
 Stits SA-11A Playmate
 Stits DS-1 Baby Bird

Stockwell
(Erwin Stockwell)
 Stockwell flying Corvair

Stoddard-Hamilton 
(Stoddard-(Tom) Hamilton Aircraft Inc, Arlington WA)
 Glasair I
 Glasair II
 Glasair III
 Glasair Glastar
 Glasair Turbine 250
 Glasair SH
 Glasair Arocet AT-9 Stalker

Stoeckel
 Stoeckel Monoplane

Stoelk 
(William E Stoelk, Manning IA & Wendel G Hacker, Templeton IA.)
 Stoelk 1930 Monoplane (aka Hacker monoplane)

Stolp 
(Stolp Starduster Corp (Louis A Stolp & George M Adams), Compton CA.)
 Stolp SA-100 Starduster
 Stolp SA-101 Super Starduster
 Stolp SA-300 Starduster Too
 Stolp SA-500 Starlet
 Stolp SA-700 Acroduster I
 Stolp SA-750 Acroduster Too
 Stolp SA-900 V-Star

Stone 
(Stone & Fry, Park City MT.)
 Stone S-2

Stone 
(Edward R Stone, Wichita KS.)
 Stone B-2

Storey 
(Tom Storey)
 Storey TSR.3 Wonderplane

Storey Thomas
 Storey Thomas #2 Special

Storm 
(Storm Aircraft Srl, Saubadia, Italy)
 Storm Century
 Storm Rally
 Storm RG Fury
 Storm 280
 Storm 300
 Storm 320E
 Storm Sea Storm

Storms 
((N E) Storms Aircraft Co, Asheville NC. 1929: Spartanburg Aviation Co, Spartanburg SC.)
 Storms Flying Flivver

Stossel 
(W J Stossel, Palm Beach FL.)
 Stossel A-1

Stout 
(Stout Metal Airplane Div, Ford Motor Co.)
 Stout 1-AS Air Sedan
 Stout 2-AT Air Pullman
 Stout 3-AT
 Stout Batwing
 Stout Batwing Limousine
 Stout Bushmaster 2000
 Stout Cootie
 Stout Skycar I
 Stout Skycar II
 Stout Skycar III
 Stout Skycar IV
 Stout C-65
 Stout C-107
 Stout ST-1
 Stout SV-1
 Stout TT
 Stout Dragonfly amphibian

Stralpes Aéro
(Stralpes Aéro SARL)
 Stralpes Aéro ST-11M Minimus

Strandgren 
 Strandgren Cyclogiro

Strat (aircraft constructor) 
 Strat 1949 Monoplane

Stratolaunch Systems 
 Stratolaunch carrier aircraft

Stratos Aircraft
(Redmond, Oregon, United States)
Stratos 714

Straughn 
((Frank) Straughn Aircraft Corp, Wichita KS.)
 Straughn A
 Straughn B

Straughn-Holmes 
 Straughn-Holmes A

Streamline Welding
(Hamilton, Ontario, Canada)
Ultimate 10-180
Ultimate 10-200
Ultimate 10-300

Strickland 
((C Kenneth) Strickland Aircraft Corp, High Point NC.)
 Strickland 1948 Monoplane

Striplin Aircraft
(Jim Striplin)
Striplin FLAC
Striplin Lone Ranger
Striplin Sky Ranger
Striplin Silver Cloud
Striplin Silver Cloud II

Strojnik
(Dr. Alex and Cirila Strojnik)
 Strojnik S-4 Laminar Magic

Strom-Olesen 
(Carl Strom & Oscar Olesen, Mineola NY.)
 Strom-Olesen Monoplane

Stroop 
(Robert C Stroop, Rome GA, Jacksonville AL.)
 Stroop Scout
 Stroop SP-4
 Stroop SP-7

Stroukoff 
( (Michael) Stroukoff Aircraft Corp, Trenton NJ.)
 Stroukoff YC-123E Provider
 Stroukoff YC-134 (YC-123D)
 Stroukoff YC-134A Pantobase
 Stroukoff YC-134 Pantobase

Stupar 
(Chicago Aero Works (pres: H S Renton), 345 River St, Cicero IL.)
 Stupar 1914 Biplane#1
 Stupar 1914 Biplane#2

Sturtevant 
Sturtevant Aeroplane Co (pres: Noble Foss, vp/gen mgr: Grover C Loening, div of Sturtevant Mfg Co, Jamaica Plain, Massachusetts)
 Sturtevant A(A-1) Tractor
 Sturtevant A(A-2) Seaplane
 Sturtevant A (A-3) Battleplane
 Sturtevant B-1 Speed Scout
 Sturtevant B-2 Pursuit
 Sturtevant P-L Tractor
 Sturtevant S-2 Trainer
 Sturtevant S-3
 Sturtevant S-4 Seaplane
 Sturtevant S-4 Tractor
 Sturtevant School Hydroaeroplane
 Sturtevant Steel Trainer
 Sturtevant Trainer

References

Further reading

External links

 List Of Aircraft (S)

de:Liste von Flugzeugtypen/N–S
fr:Liste des aéronefs (N-S)
nl:Lijst van vliegtuigtypes (N-S)
pt:Anexo:Lista de aviões (N-S)
ru:Список самолётов (N-S)
sv:Lista över flygplan/N-S
vi:Danh sách máy bay (N-S)